Spodnje Preloge is a settlement in the Municipality of Slovenske Konjice in eastern Slovenia. It lies between Koprivnica and Polenščica creeks, right tributaries of the Dravinja River west of Slovenske Konjice. The area is part of the traditional region of Styria. The municipality is now included in the Savinja Statistical Region.

References

External links
Spodnje Preloge at Geopedia

Populated places in the Municipality of Slovenske Konjice